Government High School, Karwar (established in 1864) is the oldest high school in the Uttar Kannaad district of India.

Former Headmasters
 Mrs. Ramabai B Naik - from Hanehalli (1970-1977 in school)
 Shri B B Shaikh - 1950?
 Shri S P Patil - 1953-54
 Sri K.M.Raghavendra Rao Ex Head Master 1872-1876.
 Rev.Titus Costa Ex Head Master 1876-1896.

Notable alumni
 Venkanna H. Naik

References
   Government High School, Karwar is the oldest High School in Uttar Kannada

Schools in Uttara Kannada district
High schools and secondary schools in Karnataka
Education in Karwar
Educational institutions established in 1864
1864 establishments in India

Government High school of Karwar is one of the oldest institutions in the Uttara Kannada District of  Karnataka. It was started in June 1864 with 43 students on its rolls, to fulfil the educational aspiration of the people of  Karwar, the then newly formed district Head-Quarters.  Late shri Vinayak Janardhan Kirtane was the first Head Master and the school was housed in a  building  near the present  Mitra Samaj site.  In 1871, it was shifted to the present  building. Actually, it became a full fledged high school in the year 1878 and earlier to that it was teaching only up to std. V.  The then Head Master  Rev. Titus Costa and his trusted lieutenant Shri K. M. Raghavendra Rao  were mainly responsible for providing a definite and sound foundation to this Institution.  Till 1950, this school was known as Karwar High School and for a long period of time this was the only high school in the district.
Over the last one and a half century of  its prolonged existence, the school has rendered yeoman educational service to the district  and has gained a very high reputation.  Several of the alumni of this school have excelled and emerged as leaders in various arena, including the political and judicial. Hundreds of   old students of this school are now scattered over the whole of the nation and also outside and many among them are occupying high places in administrative, educational and other fields. It is a matter of highest pride to recall that  Sri  Narayan Ganesh Chandavar who rose to the coveted position of  the  President of the Indian National Congress  and also the Judge of the High Court of Bombay was the old student of  this school.